The Glendale Register of Historic Resources and Historic Districts consist of buildings, structures, bridges, statues, trees, and other objects designated by the City of Glendale, California, as significant historic resources or historic districts.

The City of Glendale's historic preservation program began in 1977 with the designation of 28 properties as city landmarks. The Glendale Register of Historic Resources was created in 1997 with the original 28 city landmarks and nine additional properties. The register now includes more than 100 properties.

The City of Glendale has also established five historic districts (Ard Eevin Highlands, Cottage Grove, Royal Boulevard, Brockmont Park, and Rossmoyne) which are also covered by this article. The historic district program began in 2006 with the adoption of guidelines by the Glendale Historic Preservation Commission.

Ten of the properties listed on the Glendale Register are also listed on the National Register of Historic Places (NRHP). These include the Catalina Verdugo Adobe (NRHP 1976), James Daniel Derby House (NRHP 1978), Hotel Glendale (NRHP 1994), Alex Theatre (NRHP 1996), Glendale Southern Pacific Railroad Depot (NRHP 1997), Ard Eevin (NRHP 2006), and Grand Central Air Terminal (NRHP 2017). The Catalina Verdugo Adobe is the only building in Glendale to be designated on the NRHP and the Glendale Register, and also recognized as a California Historical Landmark (designated as CHL No. 637 in 1958).

Although not listed on the Glendale Register, the Rockhaven Sanitarium Historic District is located in Glendale and is listed on the National Register.

A map displaying the locations of Glendale's designated historic resources can be viewed by clicking "OpenStreetMap" in the template found to the right below.

Glendale Register of Historic Resources

Glendale Historic Districts

See also
 National Register of Historic Places listings in Los Angeles County, California
 California Historical Landmarks in Los Angeles County, California

References

Glendale
Glendale
Glendale
Glendale